Mårtensson, Mårtenson and Martenson are surnames. Notable people with the names include:

Agneta Mårtensson (born 1961), Swedish freestyle swimmer
Anders Mårtensson (1893–1973), Swedish vaulter who competed in the 1920 Summer Olympics
Bertil Mårtensson (1945–2018), Swedish author of science fiction, crime fiction and fantasy; also an academic philosopher
Bodil Mårtensson (born 1952), Swedish author of crime novels and adventure books
Christer Mårtensson (born 1954), Swedish curler, World and European champion
Frithiof Mårtensson (1884–1956), Swedish wrestler who competed in the 1908 Summer Olympics
Göran Mårtensson (born 1960), Swedish Army lieutenant general
Jan Mårtenson (born 1933), Swedish diplomat and writer of crime novels
Jörgen Mårtensson (born 1959), Swedish orienteer
Johan Mårtensson (born 1989), Swedish football player
Lasse Mårtenson (born 1934), Finnish singer
Mona Mårtenson (1902–1956), Swedish actress
Stina Mårtensson (1882–1962), Swedish missionary
Tony Mårtensson (born 1980), Swedish ice hockey player

Swedish-language surnames